Smithdale may refer to:

Smithdale, Mississippi, a community in Amite County
Smithdale, Pennsylvania, a community in Allegheny County